Filet Meow is a 1966 Tom and Jerry short directed by Abe Levitow and produced by Chuck Jones. The title is a reference to filet mignon. This is a re-working of the 1951 Hanna-Barbera Jerry and the Goldfish as another short about Jerry saving a goldfish from Tom.

Plot
As morning approaches, Tom sneaks into the living room and sees a female goldfish swimming in a bowl. Tom does not want to eat such a sweet creature at first, but he assuages himself that he must eat. He extends his arm into the bowl and gropes for the fish, but she lets out a bubble that drifts into Jerry's hole and carries the message: "Help!" Jerry wakes up and grasps a long, slender pin. Tom, triumphant in his success, sneaks back out of the living room, but is soon seen leaping out through the door and through a window in pain from being struck with the pin. Jerry returns the fish to the bowl.

Tom revives and removes the pin from his behind, but soon finds he is stuck in a trash can. He pops his arms and eyes out of the can and tests himself with the pin; it will not work on the steel. Tom grabs an axe and rushes into the house. Jerry is terrified at the sight of the "evil trash monster" and runs toward his hole, suffering numerous near misses from the axe. Tom continues chopping at the hole, but Jerry inserts Tom's tail in the axe's path. Tom soon realizes that he's cut up his own tail and screws it back on before he hears a whistle. It is Jerry waving at him, with a grease slick set out for the cat. Tom cannot see the grease and slips on it. Jerry closes the door on Tom, which smashes him into the lid of the can. Tom walks out as Jerry shows him the door and he falls onto an open trash can. The trash man soon collects him and he is dumped into the trash truck, which drives away. After a few seconds, the cat walks back down the street, fuming. Tom goes to the garden and he removes tacks from inside his foot, and he begins his plan for revenge.

He sneaks back into the house with a hose system and sees Jerry standing guard with another long pin. Tom hides under the table and builds his hose system with a lot of residual noise. Jerry and the fish appear terrified. Tom emerges and lays the hose around the house until he runs out.

Jerry begins scratching his head when suddenly the fish disappears down a hole in the bowl. Jerry pulls her out and realizes that Tom is sucking into the water and spitting it out so that he will eventually swallow the fish, except that Jerry already pulled her out of the hose without Tom knowing. Jerry fills a large container with water to serve as a temporary bowl. Whilst Tom is still at it, Jerry sees all the water disappearing from the bowl and then sees part of the hose. Jerry comes up with an idea and dashes off while Tom is beginning to get frustrated.

After some time, Tom notices that the room he is in is now half-flooded with water and he still hasn't got the fish, but he continues on sucking and spitting out the water, unaware that Jerry has hooked up the other end of the hose to a full bathtub. Jerry waves at the passing truck labeled "SEA VIEW PET SHOP" and it dumps its cargo in: a large green shark, which sees Jerry and attempts to devour the mouse, but is sucked into the hose by Tom.

Tom, who apparently has filled the entire room with water, completely underwater, then sees that he has sucked the shark into the hose. In an attempt to push the shark back into the bathtub, Tom puffs up the hose but the shark bursts it. The shark chases after Tom and bites his tail which rips off Tom's fur in the process. Tom swims off half-naked through the wall and the grass. With Tom gone, Jerry begins to charm the fish, but is soon terrified by the shark that has entered the fishbowl. Jerry panics and follows the same route that Tom took out of the house before the shark could eat him while he charms her with a grin.

Notes

The shark who appears here was one of the several who appeared in the original series of Tom and Jerry and was based after Porpoise (a shark created for the original series of Tom and Jerry.)

Crew
Animation: Don Towsley, Tom Ray, Dick Thompson, Ben Washam & Ken Harris
Layouts: Don Morgan & Robert Givens
Backgrounds: Philip DeGuard
Design Consultant: Maurice Noble
Vocal Effects: Mel Blanc, William Hanna & June Foray
Production Manager: Earl Jonas
Story: Bob Ogle
Music: Dean Elliott
Production Supervised by Les Goldman
Produced by Chuck Jones
Directed by Abe Levitow

External links

1966 animated films
1966 films
1966 short films
Animated films about fish
Films directed by Abe Levitow
Tom and Jerry short films
1960s American animated films
1966 comedy films
Remakes of American films
Films scored by Dean Elliott
Animated films without speech
Metro-Goldwyn-Mayer short films
Metro-Goldwyn-Mayer animated short films
MGM Animation/Visual Arts short films